Ngapa may refer to:

 Ngapa, Burma, a village in Kale Township, Sagaing Region of Burma
 Ngapa, Central Sulawesi, a village in Donggala Regency, Central Sulawsi, Indonesia
 Ngapa, South East Sulawesi, a village in Kolaka Regency, South East Sulawesi, Indonesia
 Ngapa, Mozambique, a village in Mueda District, Cabo Delgado Province, Mozambique